This is a list of counties in Scotland, ordered by area as at the 1951 census.

Cities

See also
List of Scottish council areas by area

Notes and references

Counties of Scotland
1951 United Kingdom census
1951 in Scotland